Saifuzzaman Chowdhury (born 18 February 1969) is a Bangladesh Awami League politician and the Minister of Land since 2019. He is a member of parliament.

Early life 
Saifuzzaman Chowdhury was born on 18 February 1969 in Anwara, Chattogram. His father was freedom fighter and senior Awami League leader Akhtaruzzaman Chowdhury and his mother was Noor Nahar Jaman. His wife, Rukhmila Zaman, is the chairperson of United Commercial Bank.

Career 
Chowdhury was elected to the parliament from Chittagong-13 in 2014. He is a member of the executive committee of United Commercial bank and Chairman of the Arameet group. He was thrice elected President of Chittagong Chamber of Commerce.

In 2020, Chowdhury received the UN Public Service award for digitalising services of the Ministry of Land.

References

Living people
People from Anwara Upazila
1969 births
Awami League politicians
9th Jatiya Sangsad members
10th Jatiya Sangsad members
11th Jatiya Sangsad members
Land ministers of Bangladesh